Mmamu River is a river which has its source in Mmaku community, in Awgu LGA with a large expanse at Inyi, Oji River LGA, Enugu State.

Origin
The story of the origin of Mmamu as told by one Jude Orji from the community is surrounded in mystery as the goddess was said to have been linked to a man called Mmaku. As a result, the name of the town was said to have been derived from the deity. In those days, the story continues, there were inter-tribal wars and the people of Mmaku took refuge in the deity and indeed, no community dared the power of Mmamu, the goddess.

During the civil war, soldiers on the Nigerian side were victims of circumstance as many of them were said to have died after eating fishes caught from the river.

Nigerian Tribune observed that Mmaku town is located atop a hill even as it is surrounded by hills. Perhaps, because of its proximity to Awgu, which Biafrans used as training ground for their soldiers during the civil war, the federal troops then turned the town to a war zone and occupied the area for a greater part of the crisis.

Worship
One striking feature of Mmamu is that people do not go to the river to fish as it is a taboo to do so.

In Mmamu River, there is a species of snake that is forbidden by the people and no one dares to kill or eat it. Nigerian Tribune learnt that this special species of snake dotted in green colour is said to personify the Mmamu deity. Little wonder, the snakes are called "Nne ocheie", meaning "grandmother". They are believed to be in feminine form with a structure of an old woman.

It was also gathered that the snakes in the river are harmless to the indigenes just as a mother, in real life, does no harm to her child. Further checks revealed that when such snakes die, they are given a befitting burial with all rites accorded to a human being, as the chief of the deity is invited to perform such burials. The significance of the death of such snakes indicates a bad omen for the people as it means that danger looms in the area. When this occurs, an oracle is consulted and sacrifices are made to appease the gods of the land. The danger ahead could then be averted.

The Mmamu deity also personifies justice as those perceived injured or shortchanged in one way or the other seek justice from the goddess. There is a tree standing in front of the shrine of the deity which leaf, people of the area call “Nkpa-akwukwo- Mmamu”. The leaf of the magic tree is often hung on vehicles by those who believe in the deity as a way of protecting their property. They believe that if their vehicle is stolen, it would be returned to its owner.

References

Rivers of Nigeria